Sudhakar Panditrao Kurdukar (born 16 January 1935) is a former Chief Justice of the Punjab & Haryana High Court in January 1994. Later he became a Judge of the Supreme Court of India in March 1996 and retired in January 2000. He was earlier a Judge in the Bombay High Court. He was acting Governor of Punjab from July '94 to September '94.

See also
 List of Governors of Punjab (India)

References 

Governors of Punjab, India
1935 births
Justices of the Supreme Court of India
Chief Justices of the Punjab and Haryana High Court
Judges of the Bombay High Court
Living people
20th-century Indian judges